The Hopfner HA-11/33 was an amphibious flying boat built in Austria in 1933 to a specification by the Dr. Oetker company. The result was a conventional, high-wing cantilever monoplane with a stepped flying boat hull and pontoons on struts under the wings at mid-span. The cabin was fully enclosed, and the twin engines were mounted tractor-fashion on struts above the wing.

Development
A HA-11/33 was purchased by the Austrian Air Force, and was subsequently absorbed into the German Luftwaffe following the Anschluss. Deemed worthy of further development, WNF (which had absorbed Hirtenberg, which itself had taken over Hopfner) was tasked with developing it into a military training aircraft for flying boat pilots. Designated WNF Wn 11 by the RLM, testing was undertaken at Travemünde in 1940, but the type was not ordered into production. Development of a highly streamlined derivative with Hirth HM 508 engines, the WNF Wn 11C was also abandoned.

Specifications

References

Further reading

External links
 Hopfner HA.11/33 Уголок неба. 2011

1930s Austrian civil utility aircraft
Flying boats
HA-11 33
Amphibious aircraft
Wiener Neustadter aircraft
High-wing aircraft
Twin piston-engined tractor aircraft
Aircraft first flown in 1933